The 25th Senate District of Wisconsin is one of 33 districts in the Wisconsin State Senate.  Located in northwest Wisconsin, the district comprises all of Ashland, Barron, Bayfield, Burnett, Douglas, Iron, Price, and Washburn counties, and part of northern Sawyer County.  The 25th Senate district is the largest Wisconsin Senate district by area; mostly rural, the largest population center is the city of Superior.  The district also includes the Bad River and Lac du Flambeau Indian reservations, and most of the Chequamegon–Nicolet National Forest.

Current elected officials
Romaine Quinn is the senator representing the 25th district since January 2023.  He previously served in the State Assembly, representing the 75th Assembly district from 2015 to 2021, and was mayor of Rice Lake from 2010 through 2012. 

Each Wisconsin State Senate district is composed of three Wisconsin State Assembly districts.  The 25th Senate district comprises the 73rd, 74th, and 75th Assembly districts.  The current representatives of those districts are:
 Assembly District 73: Angie Sapik (R–Lake Nebagamon)
 Assembly District 74: Chanz Green (R–Lincoln)
 Assembly District 75: David Armstrong (R–Rice Lake)

The district is located almost entirely within Wisconsin's 7th congressional district, which is currently represented by U.S. Representative Tom Tiffany.  The portion of the district in Dunn County falls within Wisconsin's 3rd congressional district, which is represented by U.S. Representative Derrick Van Orden.

History 
The boundaries of districts have changed over history. Previous politicians of a specific numbered district have represented a different geographic area, due to redistricting.

After the fifth (1852) session of the state legislature, the Wisconsin Senate was expanded to 25 members. The first member for the 25th District was James T. Lewis, of Columbus (later a Governor of Wisconsin). The district at that time consisted of Columbia County. This was true until 1872, when the district became the counties of the counties of Green Lake, Marquette and Waushara (Columbia County was now the 
Twenty-Seventh District).

In 1876, the Senate was again redistricted: the Twenty-Fifth now consisted of the City of Madison, and various other Towns and Villages in Dane County, Wisconsin (more or less the previous Seventh District); while what had been the 25th was now the Ninth District.

In 1883, the Twenty-Fifth now consisted of Eau Claire, Pepin and Pierce Counties (three of the eleven counties which had made up the Seventh District); Dane County became the Twenty-Sixth District.

From 1887-1891, the district consisted of Clark and Eau Claire Counties. The short-lived redistricting of 1891 left the district consisting of Clark, Price, Taylor, and Wood Counties. From 1892-1895, the district once again consisted of Clark and Eau Claire Counties. From 1896-1910, the district consisted of Clark and Marathon Counties. From 1911-1922, the district consisted of Langlade and Marathon Counties. From 1923-1954, the district consisted of Lincoln and Marathon Counties.

After the 1954 redistricting, the district had completely changed, and now consisted of Ashland, Bayfield, and Douglas Counties (Lincoln and Marathon Counties had been split between the new 12th and 29th Districts). The 1960 federal census showed that this district, at 74,293 people, was the least populous of Wisconsin's 33 districts, 38.0% below the average;<ref>[http://digital.library.wisc.edu/1711.dl/WI.WIBlueBk1962 Toepel, M. G.; Theobald, H. Rupert, eds. The Wisconsin Blue book, 1962 Madison: State of Wisconsin, 1962; p. 352]</ref> in the wake of Baker v. Carr'', a redistricting would be necessary. After a great deal of litigation, the Wisconsin Supreme Court created a redistricting map promulgated on May 14, 1964. The new Twenty-Fifth District added Iron, Price, Rusk and Sawyer Counties to the district. The 1972 redistricting took away Rusk County and a southern portion of Price County, adding the eastern part of Barron County instead; but left the district mostly unchanged. The 1982 redistricting removed Price County entirely, and modified the Barron County portion, as well as adding one Rusk County township. In 1992, the latest court-ordered redistricting added the remainder of Barron County, while dropping the Rusk County township once more. The 2002 court-ordered redistricting added part of Burnett County for the first time, while taking away segments of Sawyer and Barron Counties. The new 2011 redistricting bill took away most of Sawyer, but added for the first time a single township in Vilas County, and a township from both Dunn and Saint Croix Counties, and Price County in whole.

Past senators
The district has previously been represented by:

Note: the boundaries of districts have changed repeatedly over history. Previous politicians of a specific numbered district have represented a completely different geographic area, due to redistricting.

Notes

External links
District Website
Senator Jauch Website

Wisconsin State Senate districts
Ashland County, Wisconsin
Barron County, Wisconsin
Bayfield County, Wisconsin
Douglas County, Wisconsin
Iron County, Wisconsin
Sawyer County, Wisconsin
Washburn County, Wisconsin
1852 establishments in Wisconsin